is a 1985 Japanese animated film by Sanrio, the company which animated Unico, The Sea Prince and the Fire Child and Ringing Bell, though this story is less sought out as a rarity among Sanrio cult classic collectors. It is also Sanrio's final feature-length anime film until 2007. It was brought to America in 1995 through a company called Celebrity Home Entertainment. Unlike previous works, this one mainly focuses on music more than plot, prompting it to be compared with Disney's older work Fantasia (Video Business review). The one original piece is "My Name is Florence," which contains lyrics and is sung in the film; all other songs on the soundtrack are works of classical composition, written by Beethoven and other similarly noteworthy composers.

Summary
A gentle and talented boy named Michael played beautiful music on his oboe, and his greatest love was to play for and tend to the flowers in the greenhouse at the school of music where he attended. Unfortunately, his gardening made him constantly late for orchestra practice and resulted in his dismissal from the school. When Michael fell asleep that same night, he was awakened by a dainty Flower Fairy named Florence, who would take him on an enchanted journey to a land where flowers came alive, treble notes were mischievous, and adventure beckoned. There, he would soon come to realize that his love of flowers and desire to become a great musician could go hand-in-hand and help him to become focused in life and discover himself.

Voice cast

Classical music
 Voices of Spring Waltz - Johann Strauss II
 Oboe Sonata - Gaetano Donizetti
 Symphony No. 5 - Ludwig van Beethoven
 Nocturne No. 1 op. 9 - Frederic Francois Chopin
 Salut d'amour (Meeting of Flower) - Edward William Elgar
 Symphony No. 8 "Unfinished" - Franz Peter Schubert
 Oboe Concerto in D minor, II Adagio - Alessandro Marcello
 Fugue in G minor - Johann Sebastian Bach
 Souvenir - Drdla
 Hungarian Dances No. 5 - Johannes Brahms
 Piano Sonata No. 11 1st mov - Wolfgang Amadeus Mozart
 Waltz of the Flowers from The Nutcracker - Peter Ilyich Tchaikovsky
 Tritsch-Tratsch-Polka - Johann Strauss II
 Barcarolle from Les Contes d'Hoffmann - Jacques Offenbach
 Duet of Love - Naozumi Yamamoto
 Symphonie Fantastique 4th mov - Louis Hector Berlioz
 Flight of the Bumblebee - Rimsky-Korsakov
 L' Arlesienne Suite No. 2 "Farandole" - Georges Bizet
 Symphonie Fantastique 5th mov - Louis Hector Berlioz
 The Firebird - Igor Fyodorovitch Stravinsky
 Clair de Lune - Claude Achille Debussy
 Salut d'amour (Separation of flower) - Edward William Elgar
 Oboe Concerto 3rd mov - Wolfgang Amadeus Mozart
 Violin Concerto 3rd mov - Felix Mendelssohn

References

External links

 

1985 anime films
1985 films
1980s children's fantasy films
1980s musical fantasy films
Dance in anime and manga
Discotek Media
Films about fairies and sprites
Films directed by Masami Hata
Japanese animated fantasy films
1980s Japanese-language films
Japanese musical fantasy films
Sanrio
Visual music
1980s English-language films